The Bernstein Prize is an annual Israeli literary award for writers 50 years of age and younger. The prize is awarded by the Bernstein Foundation, named after Mordechai Bernstein, who left money in his estate to establish a foundation in order to encourage young Hebrew writers. The foundation is managed by Book Publishers Association of Israel.

The prize has been awarded since 1978 to writers in following four categories:

 Original Hebrew-language novel (presented every year - 50,000 shekel prize). 
 Book of original Hebrew-language poetry (presented every two years - 25,000 shekel prize). 
 Original Hebrew-language play (presented every two years - 25,000 shekel prize). 
 Literary criticism (presented every two years - 15,000 shekel prize).
 
For each category there are separate professional committees to determine the winners.

The prize awards are the second largest prize purses in literature in Israel, exceeded only by the Sapir Prize.

Recent Winners
 2009 Ronit Matalon won the prize for best original Hebrew novel, for her book Kol Tsa'adenu (The Sound of our Steps).
 2011 Sayed Kashua won the award for best original Hebrew novel, for his book Second Person Singular
 2013 Assaf Gavron for his novel The Hilltop
 2015 Roy Hasan
 2015 Dorit Rabinyan for the novel Gader Hayah (English: All the Rivers, originally titled Borderlife)

References

External links
 The Hebrew Writers Association in Israel website - Prizes (in Hebrew)

 
Israeli literary awards
Jewish literary awards
Hebrew literary awards
Israeli awards
Awards established in 1978
1978 establishments in Israel